The America Zone was one of the two regional zones of the 1952 Davis Cup.

5 teams entered the America Zone, with the winner going on to compete in the Inter-Zonal Zone against the winners of the Europe Zone and Eastern Zone. The United States defeated Canada in the final and progressed to the Inter-Zonal Zone.

Draw

Quarterfinals

United States vs. Japan

Semifinals

Cuba vs. United States

Canada vs. Mexico

Final

Canada vs. United States

References

External links
Davis Cup official website

Davis Cup Americas Zone
America Zone
Davis Cup